Greater Beirut is the urban agglomeration comprising the city of Beirut (Beirut Governorate) and the adjacent municipalities over the Mount Lebanon Governorate. It does not constitute a single administrative unit. Greater Beirut geographically stretches south to the Damour River in the Chouf District until it reaches the "Nahr al-Kalb" river in the Keserwan District in the north. It also comprises many towns and cities in the mountains in the Aley District, Baabda District and Metn District Districts, most notably being the cities of Baabda, Beit Mery, Bchamoun and Mtaileb. The conurbation spreads south, east, and north of Beirut city. To the west, the Eastern Mediterranean Sea serves as a natural boundary.

Demographics 
Greater Beirut is equally split between Christians and Muslims:

 West Beirut is predominantly Sunni (30%).
 South Beirut is predominantly Shia (15%).
 East and North Beirut are predominantly Christian (55%), of which 35% Catholic and 20% Orthodox. Other minorities including Druze amount to 1%.

List of settlements

 Ain Aanoub
 Ain Saadeh
 Antelias
 Aramoun
 Baabda
 Basateen
 Bdadoun
 Bechamoun
 Beirut
 Beit Chabab
 Beit Mery
 Bourj Hammoud
 Bourj el-Barajneh
 Bsalim
 Choueifat
 Chemlane
 Chiyah
 Damour
 Dahieh
 Dbayeh
 Dora
 Dekwaneh
 Hadath
 Hazmieh
 Jal el Dib
 Jdeideh
 Khaldeh
 Kfarshima
 Mansourieh
 Mkalles
 Mtaileb
 Na'ameh
 Naccache
 Qornet Shehwan
 Rabieh
 Roumieh
 Yarze
 Zalka

References

 
Beirut
Metropolitan areas of Lebanon